Flacco is an Italian surname. Notable people with the surname include:

Joe Flacco (born 1985), American football player
Orlando Flacco, 16th century painter from Verona
Tom Flacco (born 1994), American football player
Flacco, alter ego of Australian comedian Paul Livingston (born 1956)

See also
Flacco (c. 1790-1842), a chief of the Lipan Apache people, a Native American tribe
Flaccus

Italian-language surnames